Hino Rio-Grandense is the anthem of the brazilian state of Rio Grande do Sul. It's also called Hino Farroupilha due to the historical period that the anthem was written, in the Ragamuffin War. The melody was composed by Joaquim José Mendanha, the lyrics by Francisco Pinto da Fontoura and harmonization by Antonio Corte Real. The original lyrics passed for a lot of changes and the current were adopted on January 5, 1966 in the period of the military government|

Lyrics

References

Culture in Rio Grande do Sul
Brazilian anthems
Regional songs